The SuperCPU  is a processor upgrade for the  and  personal computer platforms. The SuperCPU uses the W65C816S  microprocessor.

History 
It was developed by Creative Micro Designs, Inc and released on May 4, 1997. 

It used a device called the RamCard to increase its capabilities. The card is no longer sold by Creative Micro Designs as of 2001; the distribution was taken over from 2001 to 2009 by the U.S. company Click Here Software Co., but it is unclear if any were manufactured after 2001.

Technical description 
The unit can have up to  installed. Using the RamCard (SuperCard), fast page mode (FPM) not EDO memory modules with PS/2-SIMM socket can be used in the capacities of 1, 4, 8 or 16 MB.

External links 
The SuperCPU Home (from 2022) with FAQ and software.
archive.org/geocities.com: CMD Product review, CMD SuperCPU (from 2008)

References 

Commodore 64